Symmoca megalomera is a moth in the family Autostichidae. It was described by László Anthony Gozmány in 2008. It is found in Iran.

References

Moths described in 2008
Symmoca